Joseph M. White (May 10, 1781 – October 19, 1839) was a Delegate to the U.S. House of Representatives from the Florida Territory.

Born in Franklin County, Kentucky; completed preparatory studies; studied law; was admitted to the bar and practiced; moved to Pensacola, Florida in 1821; one of the commissioners under the act of Congress of May 8, 1822, "for ascertaining claims and titles to lands within the Territory of Florida"; elected to the Nineteenth United States Congress and to the five succeeding Congresses (March 4, 1825 – March 3, 1837); unsuccessful candidate for reelection to the Twenty-fifth United States Congress; author of a New Collection of Laws, Charters, etc., of Great Britain, France, and Spain Relating to Cessions of Lands, with the Laws of Mexico, in two volumes published in 1839. He died in St. Louis, Missouri and is buried at Bellefontaine Cemetery.
 

1781 births
1839 deaths
Delegates to the United States House of Representatives from Florida Territory
Members of the Florida Territorial Legislature
19th-century American politicians
19th-century American lawyers